Mitchell McGovern (born 11 October 1994) is a professional Australian rules footballer playing for the Carlton Football Club in the Australian Football League (AFL). He was drafted with the forty-third selection in the 2014 national draft by the Adelaide Football Club from West Australian Football League (WAFL) club Claremont.

AFL career
In 2015, McGovern's first season at AFL level was interrupted by injuries, but he showed promise in the South Australian National Football League (SANFL), kicking 15 goals in 11 games for Adelaide's reserves side. He made his AFL debut in round 1, 2016 against North Melbourne.

During the last quarter of the Round 3 Showdown in 2017, McGovern injured his hamstring and had to leave the ground for the rest of the match.

In Round 19 2017, McGovern took a large pack mark with approximately two seconds left in the last quarter and goaled after the final siren to draw with  despite his team at one stage being 50 points down during the match.

At the conclusion of the 2018 season, McGovern informed the Crows he would like to be traded, despite having two years left on his contract.

Personal life
Mitch is the younger brother of  player Jeremy McGovern, and the son of former  and  player Andrew McGovern. Mitch McGovern, after being tutored by Cam Ellis-Yolmen, is proficient at the didgeridoo.

Statistics
 Statistics are correct to end of round 23, 2021

|- style="background:#eaeaea;"
! scope="row" style="text-align:center" | 2016
| style="text-align:center" | 
| 41 || 23 || 32 || 21 || 142 || 88 || 230 || 96 || 60 || 1.4 || 0.9 || 6.2 || 3.8 || 10.0 || 4.2 || 2.6
|-
! scope="row" style="text-align:center" | 2017
| style="text-align:center" | 
| 41 || 13 || 20 || 17 || 105 || 42 || 147 || 66 || 34 || 1.5 || 1.3 || 8.1 || 3.2 || 11.3 || 5.1 || 2.6
|- style="background:#eaeaea;"
! scope="row" style="text-align:center" | 2018
| style="text-align:center" | 
| 41 || 12 || 15 || 13 || 124 || 31 || 155 || 78 || 22 || 1.3 || 1.1 || 10.3 || 2.6 || 12.9 || 6.5 || 1.8
|-
! scope="row" style="text-align:center" | 2019
| style="text-align:center" | 
| 11 || 16 || 22 || 11 || 96 || 40 || 136 || 60 || 24 || 1.4 || 0.7 || 6.0 || 2.5 || 8.5 || 3.8 || 1.5
|- style="background:#eaeaea;"
! scope="row" style="text-align:center" | 2020
| style="text-align:center" | 
| 11 || 1 || 1 || 1 || 4 || 3 || 7 || 4 || 2 || 1.0 || 1.0 || 4.0 || 3.0 || 7.0 || 4.0 || 2.0
|- style="background:#eaeaea;"
! scope="row" style="text-align:center" | 2021
| style="text-align:center" | 
| 11 || 5 || 6 || 4 || 42 || 14 || 56 || 24 || 13 || 1.2 || 0.8 || 7.0 || 2.3 || 9.3 || 4.0 || 2.2
|- class="sortbottom"
! colspan=3| Career
! 81
! 104
! 67
! 579
! 233
! 812
! 363
! 175
! 1.3
! 0.8
! 7.2
! 2.9
! 10
! 4.5
! 2.2
|}

References

External links

Living people
1994 births
Australian rules footballers from Western Australia
Carlton Football Club players
Adelaide Football Club players
Claremont Football Club players